Abdelkarim is a given name. Notable people with the name include:

Abdelkarim al-Kabariti (born 1949), prime minister of Jordan from 4 February 1996 to 9 March 1997
Awatef Abdelkarim (born 1931), Egyptian composer of contemporary classical music
Raouf Abdelkarim (born 1978), Egyptian male artistic gymnast, representing his nation at international competitions
Abdelkarim Hussein Mohamed Al-Nasser, alleged member and suspected leader of the terrorist organization Saudi Hizballah
Abdelkarim Badjadja (born 1945), Algerian archivist and historian
Abdelkarim Bendjemil (born 1959), former Algerian handball player
Abdelkarim Ghellab (born 1919), Moroccan political journalist, cultural commentator, and novelist
Abdelkarim El Hadrioui (born 1972), former Moroccan footballer
Abdelkarim El Haouari (born 1993), Moroccan fencer
Abdelkarim Harouni, Tunisian politician
Abdelkarim Hassan (born 1993), Qatari footballer
Abdelkarim Jouaiti (born 1962), Moroccan novelist
Abdelkarim Kissi (born 1980), Moroccan football midfielder
Abdelkarim Krimau, nicknamed "Krimau", (born 1955), Moroccan former professional football (soccer) player
Abdelkarim Nafti (born 1981), Tunisian football player
Abdelkarim Qasim (1914–1963), nationalist Iraqi Army brigadier, seized power in a 1958 coup d'état, eliminating the Iraqi monarchy
Abdelkarim Tabbal (born 1931), Moroccan poet
Abdelkarim Zbidi (born 1950), Tunisian politician

See also